Mobcaster was a US website for crowdfunding television shows.  It will also distribute shows once they are produced.  Project creators post ideas for pilots.  If the pilots get funded, then project creators can post projects for full production.  Mobcaster charges 5% of funding, plus 3% for PayPal charges.  If a Mobcaster-funded show is picked up by other distribution outlets, Mobcaster holds 15% participation in the show.

The site shut down in September 2013.

See also
Comparison of crowd funding services
Offbeatr

References 

 Molly McHugh, “TV show crowdfunding platform Mobcaster reaches $100k in project fundraising”, Digital Trends, 2 November 2012.
 Adrienne Burke, “Crowdfunding for Couch Potatoes: Mobcaster Wants to Democratize TV Programming”, Forbes, 12 April 2012

Defunct crowdfunding platforms of the United States